Hypsidracon is a genus of moths belonging to the subfamily Olethreutinae of the family Tortricidae.

Species
Hypsidracon kururana Razowski, 2012
Hypsidracon saurodoxa Meyrick, 1934

See also
List of Tortricidae genera

References

 , 2012: Tortricidae (Lepidoptera) from the Tervuren Museum, 3: Hypsidracon Meyrick and Gnathodracon gen. n.. Polish Journal of Entomology 81 (4): 335-346

External links

tortricidae.com

Olethreutinae
Tortricidae genera